Breynia neanika is a species of sea urchins of the Family Loveniidae. Their armour is covered with spines. Breynia neanika was first scientifically described in 1982 by McNamara.

See also 

 Breynia desorii
 Breynia elegans
 Breynia vredenburgi

References 

Animals described in 1982
Spatangoida